The Red Piano was a concert residency by English singer-songwriter Sir Elton John. The residency took place at The Colosseum at Caesars Palace in Las Vegas. The idea for the show originated in 2004 by Elton John and David LaChapelle.

Show
The Red Piano was originally scheduled to be 75 shows over three years, but ended up being 247 shows over six years. John ended his residency at the Colosseum on 22 April 2009. The show was replaced by Cher's Cher at the Colosseum  and Bette Midler's The Showgirl Must Go On.

Setlist
Bennie and the Jets
Philadelphia Freedom
Believe
Daniel
Rocket Man
I Guess that’s why they call it the Blues
I'm Still Standing
I Want Love
Tiny Dancer
Don't Let the Sun Go Down on Me
The Bitch Is Back
Candle in the Wind
I Guess That's Why They Call It The Blues
Pinball Wizard
Saturday Night's Alright for Fighting
Your Song

Residency Dates

Cancellations and rescheduled shows

The Red Piano: Live in Europe

The Red Piano: Live in Europe was a concert tour by Elton John taking place between 2007 and 2009. The tour was the same as his Las Vegas Residency.

Background
Six European concerts taking place across summer 2007 were announced, then cancelled several months later. The cancellation was due to issues with the tour's promoter.

The first concert of The Red Piano: Live in Europe to take place was announced in June 2007, taking place at London's O2 Arena. The concert was given a four-star review by The Guardian newspaper.

Set list
This set list is representative of the performance on 20 October 2009 in Barcelona, Spain. It does not represent all concerts for the duration of the tour.

"Bennie and the Jets"
"Philadelphia Freedom"
"Believe"
"Daniel"
"Rocket Man"
"I Guess That's Why They Call It the Blues"
"Someone Saved My Life Tonight"
"Goodbye Yellow Brick Road"
"Nikita"
"Tiny Dancer"
"Don't Let the Sun Go Down on Me"
"Sorry Seems to Be the Hardest Word"
"Candle in the Wind"
Encore
"Pinball Wizard"
"The Bitch Is Back"
"I'm Still Standing"
"Saturday Night's Alright for Fighting"
Encore
"Your Song"

Tour dates

Cancellations and rescheduled shows

Notes

Recordings
The Red Piano was filmed and released to many major retailers. It was released as a single DVD disc and a 2 DVD / 2 CD Package that was exclusive to Best Buy. It was released also as a single Blu-ray and a 1 Blu-ray / 2 CD Package. The single disc features the concert only while the package set features the concert, a one-hour documentary, and the complete concert on two CD's.

References

External links
 The Red Piano
 The Red Piano UK Tour website

Elton John concert residencies
2004 concert residencies
2005 concert residencies
2006 concert residencies
2007 concert residencies
2008 concert residencies
2009 concert residencies
Caesars Palace
Concert residencies in the Las Vegas Valley